2022 Malaysia Premier Futsal League is the 3rd season of the Malaysia Premier Futsal League. It is the Malaysian professional futsal league for association football clubs, since its establishment in 2004. Selangor are the defending champions.

Team changes

New teams
 Kelantan
 Negeri Sembilan
 KPM-PST Mustangs
 Shah Alam City

Withdrawn teams
 Sarawak FA

Teams
For 2022 season, a total of 15 clubs compete in league.

League table

Result table

References

External links
 Football Association of Malaysia website
 Stadium Astro website

Liga Futsal Kebangsaan seasons
2022 in Malaysian football
2022 in Asian futsal